Dull Center is an unincorporated community located in Converse County, Wyoming, United States.

A post office called Dull Center was established in 1921, and remained in operation until 1954. Walter B. Dull, an early postmaster, gave the community his last name.

References

Unincorporated communities in Converse County, Wyoming
Unincorporated communities in Wyoming